Tullamore is a community in Brampton, Ontario, Canada. It was named after the town of Tullamore in Ireland.  The community is centred on the intersection of Airport Road and Mayfield Road.

Neighbourhoods in Brampton